Megastylus is a genus of parasitoid wasps belonging to the family Ichneumonidae.

The genus has cosmopolitan distribution.

Species:
 Megastylus aethiopicus Benoit, 1955 
 Megastylus amoenus Dasch, 1992

References

Ichneumonidae
Ichneumonidae genera